Manoj Pillai is an Indian director of advertising films. He is the founder of Thinkpot, an advertising production house headquartered in Bangalore, India.

Manoj has created many national and international commercials for brands such as Google, ISL, Axis Bank, Incredible India etc.

Life and Career 
Manoj Pillai was born in Cheppad, Kerala, India. He studied at the Govt. Boys High School, Haripad and then completed his B.E in mechanical engineer from PESIT Bangalore. After graduation, he joined KPB advertising as a copywriter. He then moved to McCann Erickson, Bangalore, where he was introduced to Santosh Sivan, who cast him in his film Malli as a forest officer. Manoj started his filmmaking career with commercials for BPL Mobile. In 2005, Manoj directed the longest TV commercial for Air Deccan.

In 2014, he directed a short film about the ballot power featuring Mr. Shyam Sharan Negi, the very first voter of independent India, an initiative by Google. This was to promote Indian voting system campaign #PledgeToVote.

In September 2014, Manoj directed the launch campaign 'C'mon India, Let's football' to promote the Indian Super League. The campaign was launched during Sunday's T20 cricket match between India and England.

Films 
Malli (2000) as forest officerAir Deccan - Old Man and the Sky (2005)
Levis Sykes - Double Agent (2006)
Google - The Long Walk (2014)
ISL - Lets Football! (2014)
Incredible India - Open Up (2014)
Myntra - The Roadster Life (2016)
Intel - Digital Traditions (2016)
ISL - Goal! (2016)
Intel: First Time Travelling - Director's Cut (2016)
Myntra Roadster - The Road is Waiting (2017)
Intel - Kasope (2017)
Intel - Adekunle (2017)
Intel - Dharavi (2018)
Google - India Inspires India (2018)
Axis Bank - Dil Se Open (2022)
Nestlé Munch - (2022)

Awards 
Inspired Indian Award
Gold Awards at goa Fest 2006

References

External links 
 

Indian advertising directors
Television commercial directors
Year of birth missing (living people)
Living people